The 2023 HBCU Legacy Bowl was a post-season college football all-star game played on February 25, 2023, at Yulman Stadium in New Orleans, Louisiana. It was the second edition of the HBCU Legacy Bowl and was the last of the all-star games that concluded the 2022–23 bowl games.

The bowl's teams are named after Jake Gaither, coach of the Florida A&M Rattlers from 1945 to 1973, and Eddie Robinson, coach of the Grambling State Tigers from 1941 to 1997.

Each team was led by co-head coaches: Chennis Berry of Benedict College and Eric Dooley of Southern University for Team Robinson, and Richard Hayes Jr. of Fayetteville State University and Trei Oliver of North Carolina Central University for Team Gaither.

On October 13, 2022, Mark Evans II, an offensive lineman for the Arkansas–Pine Bluff Golden Lions football team, was announced as the first player selected to the game.

Box score

Source:

See also
 Historically black colleges and universities#Intercollegiate sports

References

HBCU Legacy Bowl
American football competitions in New Orleans
HBCU Legacy Bowl
HBCU Legacy Bowl
College football bowls in Louisiana